Odontesthes is a genus of Neotropical silversides. They are found in fresh, brackish and salt water habitats in the southern half of South America (north to Brazil and Peru), as well as the offshore Juan Fernández and Falkland Islands. Additionally, O. bonariensis has been introduced to other continents.

The different Odontesthes species are generally quite similar in their appearance and some have been known to hybridize. Some are commercially important and the target of fisheries.

Species
Several Odontesthes were formerly included in the genus Basilichthys instead.  The currently recognized species of Odontesthes are:

 Odontesthes argentinensis (Valenciennes, 1835)
 Odontesthes bicudo L. R. Malabarba & Dyer, 2002
 Odontesthes bonariensis (Valenciennes, 1835) (Argentinian silverside)
 Odontesthes brevianalis (Günther, 1880)
 Odontesthes crossognathos Juliana M. Wingert et. al
 Odontesthes gracilis (Steindachner, 1898)
 Odontesthes hatcheri (C. H. Eigenmann, 1909)
 Odontesthes humensis F. de Buen, 1953
 Odontesthes incisa (Jenyns, 1841)
 Odontesthes ledae L. R. Malabarba & Dyer, 2002
 Odontesthes mauleanum (Steindachner, 1896)	 
 Odontesthes mirinensis Bemvenuti, 1996
 Odontesthes nigricans (J. Richardson, 1848)
 Odontesthes orientalis F. de Buen, 1950
 Odontesthes perugiae Evermann & Kendall, 1906
 Odontesthes piquava L. R. Malabarba & Dyer, 2002
 Odontesthes platensis (C. Berg, 1895)
 Odontesthes regia (Humboldt, 1821) (Chilean silverside)
 Odontesthes retropinnis (F. de Buen, 1953)
 Odontesthes smitti (Lahille, 1929)
 Odontesthes wiebrichi (C. H. Eigenmann, 1928) — validity uncertain
 Odontesthes yucuman Wingert, Ferrer & Malabarba, 2017

References

 
Atherinopsidae